Aeneator otagoensis is a species of large sea snail, a whelk, a marine gastropod mollusc in the family Buccinidae, the true whelks.

Distribution 
New Zealand

Description 
Aeneator otagoensis was discovered and described by New Zealand malacologist Harold John Finlay in 1930. Finlay's type description reads as follows:

References
This article incorporates public domain text originating from the New Zealand from the reference.

Buccinidae
Gastropods described in 1930
Taxa named by Harold John Finlay